This list of the Cenozoic life of Oregon contains the various prehistoric life-forms whose fossilized remains have been reported from within the US state of Oregon and are between 66 million and 10,000 years of age.

A

 Abies
 †Abies chaneyi
 †Abies sonomensis
  †Acamptogenotia
 †Acamptogenotia nodulosa
 †Acamptogenotia tessellata
  Acanthocardia
 †Acanthocardia brewerii
 Acer
 †Acer ashwillii
 †Acer cranei
 †Acer glabroides
 †Acer kluckingii
 †Acer manchesteri
 †Acer oligomedianum
 †Acer osmonti
 †Acer osmontii
 †Acericecis
 †Acericecis chaneyi – type locality for species
 †Achaenodon
 †Achaenodon fremdi – type locality for species
 †Achlyoscapter
 †Achlyoscapter longirostris
 Acila
 †Acila conradi
 †Acila decisa
 †Acila gettysburgensis
 †Acila nehalemensis
 †Acila shumardi
 †Acila trilineata
  Acmaea
 †Acmaea vokesi
  †Acritohippus
 †Acritohippus isonesus
 Acteon
 †Acteon chehalisensis
 †Acteon parvum
  †Actinidia
 †Actinidia oregonensis
 †Acutostrea
 †Acutostrea idriaensis
 †Adeloblarina
 †Adeloblarina berklandi
 Admete
 †Admete umbilicata
 Aechmophorus
  †Aechmophorus occidentalis
 †Aesculus
  †Aetiocetus – type locality for genus
 †Aetiocetus cotylalveus – type locality for species
 †Aetiocetus weltoni – type locality for species
 Aforia
 †Aforia campbelli
 †Aforia clallamensis – or unidentified comparable form
 †Agasoma
 †Agasoma gravidum
 Agelaius – tentative report
  †Agriochoerus
 †Agriochoerus guyotianus
 Aix
 †Aix sponsa
 Alangium
 †Alangium eydei
 †Alangium rotundicarpum
 †Alangium thomae
 †Allocyon
 †Allocyon loganensis
 †Allomys
 †Allomys simplicidens
 †Alluvisorex
 †Alluvisorex arcadentes
 Alnus
 †Alnus carpinoides
  †Alnus heterodonta
 †Alnus newberryi
 †Alwoodia
 †Alwoodia magna
 Amaea
 †Amaea dickersoni – or unidentified related form
  †Amebelodon
 Amelanchier
 †Amelanchier covea
 †Amelanchier grayi
 †Ameranella
 †Ameranella terrysmithae – type locality for species
 Ammospermophilus
 †Ammospermophilus junturensis
 Ampelocissus
 †Ampelocissus auriforma
 †Ampelocissus rooseae
 †Ampelocissus scottii
  †Amphicyon
 †Amphicyon frendens
 †Amphicyon galushai – or unidentified comparable form
 Amphissa
 †Amphissa corrugata
 †Ampullina
 †Ampullina oregonensis
 †Anabernicula
 Anadara
 †Anadara devincta
  †Anamirta
 †Anamirta leiocarpa
 Anas
 †Anas acuta
 †Anas americana
 †Anas boschas
 †Anas carolinensis
  †Anas clypeata
 †Anas cyanoptera
 †Anas discors
 †Anas platyrhynchos
 Ancilla
 †Ancilla vernisa – type locality for species
 †Anechinocardium
 †Anechinocardium lorenzanum
 †Anechinocardium weaveri
 †Ankistrosperma
 †Ankistrosperma spitzerae
 Anona
 †Anona preretriculata
 †Anonaspermum
 †Anonaspermum bonesii
 †Anonaspermum pulchrum
 †Anonaspermum rotundum
 †Anonymocarpa
 †Anonymocarpa ovoidea
 †Anorthoscutum
 †Anorthoscutum oregonensis
 Anser
 †Anser albifrons
 †Anser condoni – type locality for species
 †Antecalomys
 †Antecalomys valensis
  Antillophos
 †Antillophos dumbleana
  Antilocapra
 †Antilocapra americana – or unidentified comparable form
 †Aperiploma
 †Aperiploma bainbridgensis
 Aphananthe
 †Aphananthe maii
  †Aphelops
 †Aphelops megalodus
 Aquila
  †Aquila chrysaetos
 †Aquila pliogryps – type locality for species
 †Aquila sodalis – type locality for species
 Arbacia
 †Arbacia abiquaensis – type locality for species
  †Archaeocyon
 †Archaeocyon pavidus
 †Archaeohippus
 †Archaeohippus ultimus
 †Archaeolagus
 †Archaeolagus macrocephalus – or unidentified comparable form
  †Archaeotherium
 Architectonica
 †Architectonica blanda
 Archoplites
 †Archoplites langrellorum – type locality for species
  †Arctodus
 †Arctomyoides
 †Arctomyoides oregonensis
 Ardea
 †Ardea herodias
 †Ardea paloccidentalis – type locality for species
 Argobuccinum
 †Argobuccinum cammani
 †Argobuccinum coosense
 †Argobuccinum jeffersonense
 †Argobuccinum oregonense
 †Ascosphaera
 †Ascosphaera eocenis
 †Asterocarpinus
 †Asterocarpinus chaneyi
 †Asterocarpinus perplexans
 Astraea
 †Astraea inequalis
 Astreopora
 †Astreopora occidentalis – type locality for species
 Astropecten
 †Atriaecarpum
 †Atriaecarpum clarnense
  †Aturia
 †Aturia angustata
 †Aturia grandior – or unidentified comparable form
 †Aucuba
 †Aucuba smileyi
 †Axinosperma
 †Axinosperma agnostum
 Aythya
 †Aythya marila

B

 Balaena
 Balaenoptera
  †Balaenoptera acutorostrata – or unidentified comparable form
 Balanophyllia
  †Balanophyllia elegans
 Balanus
 Balcis
 †Barbouromeryx
 Bartramia
 †Bartramia umatilla – type locality for species
 †Basirepomys
 †Basirepomys pliocenicus – or unidentified comparable form
 †Basirepomys romensis – type locality for species
  Bathybembix
 †Bathybembix columbiana
 †Bathybembix nitor – type locality for species
 Bathytoma
 †Bathytoma gabbiana
 †Beckerosperma
 †Beckerosperma ovalicarpa
 Bela
 †Bela tabulata
  Betula
 †Betula angustifolia
 Bittium
 †Bittium eschrichti
 †Bonellitia
 †Bonellitia paucivaricata
 †Bonellitia smithwickensis – type locality for species
 †Bonellitia tumida – type locality for species
 †Bonesia
 †Bonesia spatulata
 Boreotrophon
 †Boreotrophon gracilis
 †Boreotrophon stuarti
  †Borophagus
 †Borophagus pugnator
 †Borophagus secundus – or unidentified comparable form
 Botaurus
  †Botaurus lentiginosus
 †Bouromeryx
 †Bouromeryx americanus – or unidentified comparable form
 †Bouromeryx submilleri
 Brachidontes
 †Brachidontes cowlitzensis
 Branta
 †Branta bernicla
 †Branta canadensis
 †Branta hypsibata – tentative report
 †Branta hypsibatus
 †Branta propinqua – type locality for species
 †Bruclarkia
 †Bruclarkia columbiana
 †Bruclarkia columbianum
 †Bruclarkia oregonensis
 †Bruclarkia vokesi
 Bubo
  †Bubo virginianus
 Buccinum
 †Buccinum strigillatum
 Bullia
 †Bullia bogachielia
 †Bumelia – tentative report
 †Bumelia? subangularis
 †Bursericarpum
 †Bursericarpum oregonense

C

 Cadulus
 Calliostoma
 †Calliostoma cammani
 †Calliostoma costatum
 Callista
 †Callista conradiana
  Callorhinus – tentative report
 ] †Calocedrus
 †Calocedrus schornii
 †Calycocarpum
 †Calycocarpum crassicrustae
 Calyptraea
 †Calyptraea diegoana
 †Calyptraea fastigiata
 †Calyptraea inornata
 †Calyptraea sookensis
  †Camelops
 †Camelops hesternus
 Cancellaria
 †Cancellaria oregonensis
 †Cancellaria siletzensis
 Canis
  †Canis dirus – or unidentified comparable form
 †Canis edwardii
 †Canis latrans
 †Canis lupus – or unidentified comparable form
 Cardiomya
 †Cardiomya anaticepsella – type locality for species
 †Cardiomya pavascotti
 †Carpocyon
 †Carpolithus
 †Carpolithus bellisperma
  Carya
 Caryophyllia
 †Caryophyllia oregonensis – type locality for species
 Castanea
 †Castanea basidentata
 Castanopsis
 †Castanopsis crepetii
 †Castanopsis longifolius
 Castor
 †Catalpa
 Cedrela
 †Cedrela merrillii
 †Cedrelospermum
 †Cedrelospermum lineatum
 Celleporina
 Celtis
 †Celtis burnhamae
 †Centrocercus
  †Centrocercus urophasianus
 Cercidiphyllum
 †Cercidiphyllum crenatum
  Cercis
 †Cercis maurerae
 Cerithiopsis
 †Cerithiopsis preussi – or unidentified comparable form
 †Chandlera
 †Chandlera lacunosa
 †Charitonetta
 †Charitonetta albeola
 Chen
 †Chen hyperborea
 †Chen rossii
  †Chendytes
 Chione
 †Chione ensifera
 †Chione securis
 Chlidonias
 †Chlidonias nigra
 Chlorostoma
 †Chlorostoma pacificum
  †Choerodon
 †Choerodon caninus
 †Chrysodomus
 †Chrysodomus bairdi
 †Chrysodomus imperialis
 †Chrysodomus nodiferus
 †Chrysodomus phoenicus
 †Chrysodomus tabulatus
 Ciliatocardium
 †Ciliatocardium coosense
 †Cinnamomophyllum
 †Cinnamomophyllum bendirei
 Circus
 †Circus eyaneus
 Cladrastis
 †Cladrastis oregonensis
 Clangula
  †Clangula hyemalis
 Cleyera
 †Cleyera grotei
 Clinocardium
 †Clinocardium meekianum
 †Clinocardium nuttallii
 †Clivuloturris
 †Clivuloturris levis – or unidentified comparable form
 Cochliolepis – tentative report
 †Cochliolepis schoonerensis
 Colaptes
 †Colaptes cafer
 †Colodon
 Columbella
 †Columbella gausapata
  Colus – tentative report
 †Colus precursor
 Colymbus
 †Colymbus holbellii
 †Colymbus nigricollis
 †Colymbus oligocaenus – type locality for species
 †Colymbus parvus
 †Comicilabium
 †Comicilabium atkinsii
  Comitas
 †Comitas monile
 †Comitas oregonensis
 †Comitas spencerensis
 †Comminicarpa
 †Comminicarpa friisae
 Comptonia
 †Comptonia columbiana
 †Conchocele
 †Conchocele bathyaulax
 †Conchocele bisecta
 †Conchocele taylori
 Conomitra
 †Conomitra vernoniana – type locality for species
  Conus
 †Conus armentrouti – type locality for species
 †Conus weltoni – type locality for species
 †Copemys
 †Copemys barstowensis
 †Copemys esmeraldensis
 †Copemys pagei
 †Cophocetus – type locality for genus
 †Cophocetus oregonensis – type locality for species
 Corbula
 †Corbula dickersoni
 †Cormocyon
 †Cormocyon copei
  Cornus
 †Cornus clarnensis
 †Cornwallius
 †Cornwallius sookensis
 Corvus
 †Corvus annectens – type locality for species
  †Corvus corax
 †Coryloides
 †Coryloides hancockii
  Craigia
 †Craigia oregonensis
 Crataegus
 †Crataegus merriamii
 †Crataegus newberryi
 Crenella
 †Crenella porterensis – or unidentified comparable form
 Crepidula
 †Crepidula adunca
 †Crepidula grandis – or unidentified comparable form
 †Crepidula praerupta
 †Crepidula princeps
 †Crepidula ungana
 †Cruciptera
 †Cruciptera simsonii
 †Crusafontina
 †Crusafontina minima
 Cryptomya
 †Cryptomya californica
 Cryptonatica
 †Cryptonatica affinis
 †Cryptonatica oregonensis
 †Cryptonatica pittsburgensis
  Cryptotis
 †Cryptotis adamsi
 †Cuneisemen
 †Cuneisemen truncatum
 †Cunninghamia
 †Cunninghamia chaneyi
 †Cupidinimus
 †Cupidinimus magnus
 †Curvitinospora
 †Curvitinospora formanii
 Cyclocardia
 †Cyclocardia hannibali – or unidentified comparable form
 †Cyclocardia moniligena
 †Cyclocardia subtenta
 †Cyclocardia ventricosa
 †Cyclotella
 †Cyclotella jonesii – type locality for species
 Cygnus
 †Cygnus paloregonus
 Cymatium
 †Cymatium pacificum
  †Cynarctoides
 †Cynarctoides lemur
 †Cynarctoides luskensis – or unidentified comparable form
  †Cynelos
 †Cynelos sinapius
 †Cynorca
 †Cyperacites

D

  †Daeodon
 Dafila
 †Dafila acuta
 †Daphoenodon
 †Daphoenodon robustum
  †Daphoenus
 †Daphoenus socialis
 †Dasmia
 †Dasmia americana – type locality for species
  †Dasornis – or unidentified related form
 †Davisicarpum
 †Davisicarpum limacioides
 Decodon
 †Decodon brownii
 Delectopecten
 †Delectopecten peckhami
 Dendragapus – type locality for genus
 †Dendragapus gillii – type locality for species
 †Dendrogapus
 †Dendrogapus lucasi
 †Dendrogapus nanus
 Dentalium
 †Dentalium laneensis
 †Dentalium pseudonyma
 †Dentalium rectius
 †Dentalium stentor
 †Dentisemen
 †Dentisemen parvum
 †Desmatippus
 †Desmatippus avus
 †Desmatochoerus
 †Desmatochoerus leidyi
 †Desmatolagus
  †Desmatophoca
 †Desmatophoca oregonensis
 †Desmocyon
 †Desmocyon thomsoni
  †Desmostylus
 †Desmostylus hesperus – type locality for species
 †Deviacer
 †Deviacer wolfei
  †Diceratherium
 †Diceratherium annectens
 †Diceratherium armatum
 †Dilophodelphis – type locality for genus
 †Dilophodelphis fordycei – type locality for species
 †Dinaelurus
 †Dinaelurus crassus
  †Dinictis
 †Dinictis cyclops
 †Diplobunops
 †Diplobunops kardoula – type locality for species
 Diploclisia
 †Diploclisia auriformis
 †Diplodipelta – type locality for genus
 †Diplodipelta miocenica
 †Diplodipelta reniptera
 Diplodonta
 †Diplodonta parilis
 †Diploporus
 †Diploporus torreyoides
 †Dipoides
 †Dipoides smithi – type locality for species
 †Dipoides stirtoni – type locality for species
 †Dipoides vallicula
 †Diprionomys
 †Diprionomys parvus
  Dipteronia
 Discinisca
 †Discinisca oregonensis
 †Domninoides
 Dosinia
 †Dosinia whitneyi
  †Dromomeryx
 †Dromomeryx borealis
 †Durocarpus
 †Durocarpus cordatus
 †Dyticonastis – type locality for genus
 †Dyticonastis rensbergeri – type locality for species

E

 Echinophoria
 †Echinophoria dalli
 †Ectinochilus
 †Ectinochilus macilenta
 †Ekgmowechashala
 †Emmenopterys
 †Emmenopterys dilcheri
  †Enaliarctos
 †Enaliarctos barnesi – type locality for species
 †Enaliarctos emlongi – type locality for species
 †Enaliarctos mitchelli
 †Enaliarctos tedfordi – type locality for species
 Engelhardtia
 †Engelhardtia olsoni
  Enhydra
 †Enhydrocyon
 †Enhydrocyon prolatus
 †Enhydrocyon stenocephalus
 Ennucula
 †Ennucula nuculana
  †Ensete
 †Ensete oregonense – type locality for species
 †Entoptychus
 †Entoptychus individens
 †Entoptychus planifrons
 †Entoptychus wheelerensis
 †Eohypserpa
 †Eohypserpa scottii
 †Eopleurotoma
 †Eopleurotoma ornata – or unidentified related form
 †Eosiphonalia
 †Eosiphonalia oregonensis
 Epacroleda – report made of unidentified related form or using admittedly obsolete nomenclature
 †Epacroleda epacris
  †Epicyon
 †Epicyon haydeni
 †Epicyon saevus
  †Epihippus
 †Epihippus gracilis
 Epilucina
 †Epilucina washingtoniana
 Epitonium
 †Epitonium condoni
 †Epitonium hindsii
 †Epitonium keaseyense
 †Epitonium keaseyensis
 †Epitonium schencki
 †Epitonium wyattdurhami – type locality for species
  †Eporeodon
 †Eporeodon occidentalis
 †Eporeodon trigonocephalus
  †Equisetum
 Equus
 †Equus pacificus
 †Eremochen – type locality for genus
 †Eremochen russelli – type locality for species
 †Erismatura
 †Erismatura jamaicensis
 Erolia
 †Erolia melanotos
 Ervilia – tentative report
 †Ervilia oregonensis
 †Eschatius
 †Eubrontotherium – type locality for genus
 †Eubrontotherium clarnoensis – type locality for species
 †Eucastor
 †Eucastor malheurensis
  †Eucyon
 †Eucyon davisi
 †Euoplocyon
 †Euoplocyon brachygnathus
 Euphagus
  †Euphagus cyanocephalus
 Eurytellina
 †Eurytellina aduncanasa
 Euspira
 †Euspira clementensis
 †Euspira hotsoni
 †Euspira nuciformis
 †Euspira pallida
 †Eutrephoceras
 †Eutrephoceras oregonense
 Exbucklandia
 †Exbucklandia oregonensis
 †Exilia
 †Exilia bentsonae – type locality for species
 †Exilia lincolnensis

F

 Fagus
 †Fagus pacifica
 Falco
 †Falco oregonus – type locality for species
 Felaniella
 †Felaniella snavelyi
 Ferminoscala
 †Ferminoscala dickersoni
 †Ferrignocarpus
 †Ferrignocarpus bivalvis
  Ficus
 †Ficus modesta
 †Ficus ocoyanum – or unidentified comparable form
 Fimbria
 †Fimbrialata
 †Fimbrialata wingii
 Flabellum
 †Flabellum oregonense – type locality for species
 †Flectorivus
 †Flectorivus microdontos
 †Florentiamys
 †Floridaceras
 †Floridaceras whitei
  †Florissantia
 †Florissantia ashwillii – type locality for species
 †Florissantia speirii
 †Fokieniopsis
 †Fokieniopsis praedecurrens
 †Fortunearites
 †Fortunearites endressii
 †Fothergilla
 †Fothergilla praeovata
 †Fragarites
 †Fragarites ramificans
 †Fraxinus
 †Fraxinus coulteri
 Fulgoraria
 †Fulgoraria indurata
 Fulgurofusus
 †Fulgurofusus serratus – type locality for species
 Fulica
  Fulica americana
 †Fulica infelix – type locality for species
 †Fulica minor – type locality for species
 †Fusinis
 †Fusinis dilleri – type locality for species
 Fusinus
 †Fusinus coosensis
 †Fusinus dilleri

G

 †Gagaria
 †Gagaria crenularis – type locality for species
  †Gaillardia
 †Gaillardia thomsoni
 Gari – tentative report
 †Gari furcata – or unidentified related form
  Gemmula
 †Gemmula bentsonae
 †Gemmula facula
 †Gemmula rockcreekensis
 †Gentilicamelus
 †Gentilicamelus cameloides – type locality for species
 †Gentilicamelus sternbergi
 Glaucionetta
 †Glaucionetta islandica
 †Globulicarpium
 †Globulicarpium levigatum
  Glycymeris
 †Glycymeris major
 †Glycymeris sagittata
 †Glycymeris septentrionalis
 Glyptocidaris
 †Goedertius – type locality for genus
 †Goedertius oregonensis – type locality for species
  †Gomphotherium
 †Gomphotherium obscurum
 †Goniodontomys
 †Goniodontomys disjunctus – type locality for species
 Granula
 †Granula profundorum – type locality for species
 Gyrineum – report made of unidentified related form or using admittedly obsolete nomenclature
 †Gyrineum dilleri

H

 †Hadrianus
 Halesia
 †Halesia oregona
 Haliaeetus
 †Haliaeetus leucocephalus
  †Haplohippus
 †Haplohippus texanus
 †Haplomys
 †Haplomys liolophus
 †Hemiauchenia – tentative report
 †Hemipsalodon
 †Hemipsalodon grandis
 Hemithiris
 †Hemithiris psittacea
 †Heptacodon
  Heptranchias
 †Heptranchias howelli
  †Herpetotherium
 †Herpetotherium merriami
 †Hesperhys – or unidentified comparable form
 †Hesperogaulus
 †Hesperogaulus gazini – type locality for species
 †Hesperogaulus wilsoni – type locality for species
 †Hesperolagomys
 †Hesperolagomys galbreathi – or unidentified comparable form
 †Hesperosorex – tentative report
 Heteropora
 †Hexacarpellites
 †Hexacarpellites hallii
 Hiatella
 Himantopus
 †Himantopus mexicanus
  †Hippotherium
  †Hoplophoneus
 †Hoplophoneus cerebralis
 †Hoplophoneus strigidens
 †Hovenia
 †Hovenia oregonensis
 Hydrangea
 †Hydrangea knowltonii
 †Hydrochelidon
 †Hydrochelidon nigra
  †Hypertragulus
 †Hypertragulus calcaratus
 †Hypertragulus hesperius
 †Hypertragulus planiceps
  †Hypohippus
 †Hypohippus osborni
 †Hypolagus
 †Hypolagus fontinalis
 †Hypolagus oregonensis – type locality for species
 †Hypolagus vetus
 †Hypomorphnus
 †Hypomorphnus sodalis – tentative report
 †Hypsidoris
 †Hypsidoris oregonensis – type locality for species
 †Hypsiops
 †Hypsiops breviceps
 †Hyrachyus
 †Hyrachyus eximius
 †Hystricops
 †Hystricops browni

I

  †Indarctos
 †Indarctos oregonensis – type locality for species
 †Ingentisorex
 †Ingentisorex tumididens
 †Iodes
 †Iodes chandlerae
 †Iodes multirecticulata
 †Iodicarpa
 †Iodicarpa ampla
 †Iodicarpa lenticularis
 Isocrinus
 Isurus
 †Isurus planus

J

 †Jimomys
 †Jimomys lulli
 †Joejonesia
 †Joejonesia globosa
 †Juglandiphyllites
 †Juglandiphyllites cryptatus
  Juglans
 †Juglans clarnensis
 †Juglans wheelerensis

K

  †Kalobatippus
 †Kardiasperma
 †Kardiasperma parvum
 Katherinella
 †Katherinella angustifrons
 †Keasius
 †Keasius taylori – type locality for species
 Kellia
 †Kellia saxiriva – type locality for species
 †Kellia vokesi – type locality for species
  †Keteleeria
 †Keteleeria rujadana
 †Kewia
 †Kewia marquamensis – type locality for species
 †Kolponomos
 †Kolponomos newportensis – type locality for species

L

 Lacuna
  †Lacuna vincta
 Lamelliconcha
 †Lamelliconcha clarki
 †Langtonia
 †Langtonia bisulcata
 †Lantanotherium
 Larus
 †Larus argentatus
  †Larus californicus
 †Larus oregonus – type locality for species
 †Larus philadelphia
 †Larus pristinus – type locality for species
 †Larus robustus – type locality for species
 †Laurocalyx
 †Laurocalyx wheelerae
 †Laurocarpum
 †Laurocarpum hancockii
 †Laurocarpum nutbedensis
 †Laurocarpum raisinoides
 †Leguminocarpon
 †Leidymys
 Lepeta
 †Lepeta concentrica
 †Leptarctus
 †Leptarctus oregonensis
  †Leptocyon
 †Leptocyon douglassi
 †Leptocyon mollis
 †Leptocyon vulpinus
 †Leptodontomys
 †Leptodontomys oregonensis – type locality for species
 †Leptodontomys quartzi
  Lepus
 †Lepus ennisianus
 Leukoma
 †Leukoma staminea
 †Lignicarpus
 †Lignicarpus crassimuri
 †Ligniglobus
 †Ligniglobus sinuosifibrae
 †Limicolavis
 †Limicolavis pluvianella – type locality for species
 Limnodromus
  †Limnodromus griseus – tentative report
 †Limnoecus
 †Limnoecus tricuspis – or unidentified comparable form
 Lindera
 †Lindera clarnensis
 †Lindera oregona
 †Liodontia
 †Liodontia alexandrae
 †Liodontia furlongi
  Liquidambar
 †Liracassis
 †Liracassis petrosa
 †Litheuphaea – type locality for genus
 †Litheuphaea carpenteri – type locality for species
 †Lithocarpus
 †Lithocarpus klamathensis
 †Litorhadia
 †Litorhadia astoriana
 †Litorhadia washingtonensis
 †Litorhadia washingtoni
 †Litseaphyllum
 †Litseaphyllum presanguinea
 Littorina
 †Littorina remondi
 †Lobipes
 †Lobipes lobatus
 Lophodytes
  †Lophodytes cucullatus
 †Lophopanopeus
 †Lophopanopeus baldwini – type locality for species
 †Lophortyx
 †Lophortyx shotwelli – type locality for species
 Lucinoma
 †Lucinoma acutilineata
 †Lucinoma columbiana
 †Lunaticarpa
 †Lunaticarpa curvistriata
 †Lutravus
 †Lutravus halli – or unidentified comparable form
  Lynx
 †Lynx longignathus
  Lytechinus
 †Lytechinus baldwini – type locality for species

M

 †Macginicarpa
 †Macginicarpa glabra
  †Machairodus
 †Machilus
 †Machilus asiminoides
 Macoma
 †Macoma albaria
 †Macoma arcatata
 †Macoma astori
 †Macoma calcarea
 †Macoma golikovi
 †Macoma inquinata
  †Macoma nasuta
 †Macoma vancouverensis
 Macrocallista
 †Macrocallista pittsburgensis
 †Macrognathomys
 †Macrognathomys nanus
 Mactromeris
 †Mactromeris albaria
 †Mactromeris pittsburgensis
 †Mactromeris polynyma
 †Mactromeris ramonensis
 †Mactromeris veneriformis
  Magnolia
 †Magnolia muldoonae
 †Magnolia paroblonga
 †Magnolia tiffneyi
 Mahonia
 †Mahonia simplex
 †Malus – or unidentified comparable form
  †Mammut
 †Mammut furlongi – type locality for species
 †Mammuthus
  †Mammuthus columbi – tentative report
 Marcia
 †Marcia bunkeri
 †Marcia oregonensis
 Margarites
 †Margarites pupilla
 †Marshochoerus
 †Marshochoerus socialis
 Martes
 †Martes gazini – type locality for species
 Martesia
 †Martesia turnerae
 Mastixia
 †Mastixicarpum
 †Mastixicarpum occidentale
 †Mastixioidiocarpum
 †Mastixioidiocarpum oregonense
  Megachasma
 †Megachasma applegatei
  †Megalonyx
 †Megapaloelodus
 †Megapaloelodus opsigonus – type locality for species
  †Megatylopus
 Megayoldia
 †Megayoldia chehalisensis
 Melanitta
 †Melanitta deglandi
 †Melanitta perspicillata
 †Meliosma
 †Meliosma beusekomii
 †Meliosma bonesii
 †Meliosma elongicarpa
 †Meliosma jenkinsii
 †Meliosma leptocarpa
 †Meniscomys
 †Meniscomys uhtoffi
 †Menispermum – or unidentified comparable form
 Mergus
 †Mergus merganser
 †Mergus serrator
  †Merychippus
 †Merychippus brevidontus
 †Merychippus relictus
 †Merychyus
 †Merychyus arenarum
 †Merychyus minimus
  †Merycochoerus
 †Merycochoerus magnus
 †Merycochoerus matthewi
 †Merycochoerus minor
 †Merycoides
 †Merycoides longiceps
 †Merycoidodon
 †Merycoidodon bullatus
  †Mesocyon
 †Mesocyon brachyops
 †Mesocyon coryphaeus
 †Mesohippus
 †Mesohippus bairdi – or unidentified comparable form
 †Metalopex
 †Metalopex merriami
  Metasequoia
 †Metasequoia occidentalis
 †Microphallus
 †Microphallus perplexus
 Micropodium
 †Micropodium ovatum
 †Micropternodus
 †Micropternodus morgani
 Microtus
 †Microtus montanus
  †Miohippus
 †Miohippus intermedius
 †Miopleionia
 †Miopleionia oregonensis
 †Mioplejonia
 †Mioplejonia oregonensis
 †Miotapirus
 †Mistia – type locality for genus
 †Mistia spinosa – type locality for species
 Modiolatus
 †Modiolatus rectus
 Modiolus
 †Modiolus eugenensis
 †Modiolus modiolus
 †Molopophorus
 †Molopophorus anglonana
 †Molopophorus dalli
 †Molopophorus fishii
 †Molopophorus gabbi
 †Molopophorus matthewi
 Molothrus
  †Molothrus ater – tentative report
 †Monosaulax
 †Monosaulax progressus – type locality for species
 †Monosaulax typicus – type locality for species
  †Moropus
 †Moropus oregonensis
 Mulinia
 †Mulinia eugenensis
  Mustela
 †Mya
 †Mya grewingki
 †Mya truncata
 †Mylagaulodon
 †Mylagaulodon angulatus
 Myotis – or unidentified comparable form
 †Mystipterus
 †Mystipterus pacificus
 †Mystocheilus – type locality for genus
 †Mystocheilus fresti – type locality for species
 Mytilus
 †Mytilus californianus
 †Mytilus edulis
 †Mytilus middendorffi
 †Mytilus snohomishensis

N

 †Nanotragulus – or unidentified comparable form
  Nassarius
 †Nassarius arnoldi
 †Nassarius fossata
 †Nassarius lincolnensis
 †Nassarius perpinguis
 Natica
 †Natica thomsonae
 †Natica weaveri
  †Nautilus
 †Nautilus angustatus – type locality for species
 Nectandra
 †Nectandra presannguinea
 †Nehalemia – type locality for genus
 †Nehalemia delicata – type locality for species
 Nemocardium
 †Nemocardium formosum
 †Nemocardium griphus – or unidentified comparable form
 †Nemocardium linteum
  †Neohipparion
 †Neohipparion leptode – or unidentified comparable form
  Neophrontops
 †Neophrontops dakotensis
 Neotamias
 †Neotamias malloryi
 †Nephrosemen
 †Nephrosemen reticulatus
 Nettion
 †Nettion bunkeri
 †Neurotrichus – tentative report
 †Neurotrichus columbianus
 Neverita
 †Neverita globosa
 †Neverita jamesae
 †Neverita thomsonae
 †Neverita washingtonensis
 †Nexuotapirus
 †Nexuotapirus robustus
 Nucella
 †Nucella decemcostata
 †Nucella lamellosa
 †Nucella saxicola
  Nucula
 †Nucula vokesi
 Nuculana
 †Nuculana gabbi
 †Nuculana nuculana
 Numenius
  †Numenius americanus – tentative report
 †Nuphar
 Nutricola
 †Nutricola lordi
 †Nutricola tantilla
 Nyroca
 †Nyroca affinis
 †Nyroca americana
 †Nyroca collaris – tentative report
 †Nyssa
 †Nyssa scottii
 †Nyssa spatulata

O

 †Ocajila
  Ochotona
 †Ochotona spanglei – type locality for species
  Ocotea
 †Ocotea ovoidea
 †Ocyplonessa
 †Ocyplonessa shotwelli – type locality for species
 †Odontocaryoidea
 †Odontocaryoidea nodulosa
 †Ogmophis – type locality for genus
 †Ogmophis oregonensis – type locality for species
 Olar
 †Olar buccinator
 †Olequahia
 †Olequahia schencki
 †Oligobunis
 Olivella
  †Olivella biplicata
 †Olivella mathewsonii
 †Olivella pedroana
 †Omsicarpium
 †Omsicarpium striatum
 Ondatra
 †Ondatra annectens – type locality for species
 Opalia
 †Opalia hertleini
 †Opalia williamsoni – or unidentified comparable form
 †Oregonomys
 †Oregonomys pebblespringsensis – type locality for species
 †Oregonomys sargenti
 †Oreodontoides
 †Oreodontoides oregonensis
 †Oreolagus
 †Oreolagus wallacei – type locality for species
 †Oryctoantiquus – type locality for genus
 †Oryctoantiquus borealis – type locality for species
 †Osbornodon
 †Osbornodon sesnoni
  †Osmunda
 †Osmunda occidentale
 Ostrea
  †Ostrea lurida – or unidentified comparable form
 Ostrya
 †Ostrya oregoniana

P

 †Pachycrommium
 †Pachycrommium clarki
 †Paciculus
 †Pacificotaria – type locality for genus
 †Pacificotaria hadromma – type locality for species
 †Palaeoallophylus
 †Palaeoallophylus globosa
 †Palaeoallophylus gordonii
 †Palaeocarya
 †Palaeocarya clarnensis
 †Palaeocarya olsonii – or unidentified comparable form
  †Palaeocastor
 †Palaeocastor peninsulatus
  †Palaeolagus
 †Palaeolagus haydeni
 †Palaeophytocrene
 †Palaeophytocrene hancockii
 †Palaeophytocrene pseudopersica
 †Palaeosinomenium
 †Palaeosinomenium venablesii
 †Paleopanax
 †Paleopanax oregonensis
 †Paleoplatycarya – tentative report
 †Paleoplatycarya hickeyi
 †Paleotetrix
 †Paleotetrix gilli
  Paliurus
 †Paliurus blakei
 Pandora
 †Pandora eocapsella
 †Pandora grandis
 †Pandora laevis
 Panomya
 †Panomya ampla
 Panopea
 †Panopea abrupta
 †Panopea ramonensis
 †Panopea snohomishensis
 Panthera
  †Panthera onca – or unidentified comparable form
 †Parablastomeryx
 †Paracarpinus
 †Paracarpinus chaneyi
 †Paracosoryx
 †Paracosoryx nevadensis – or unidentified comparable form
 †Paracryptotis
 †Paracryptotis rex
 †Paradaphoenus
 †Paradaphoenus cuspigerus
 †Paradomnina
 †Paradomnina relictus – type locality for species
 †Paraenhydrocyon
 †Paraenhydrocyon josephi
 †Paraenhydrocyon wallovianus
  †Parahippus
 †Parahippus leonensis – or unidentified related form
 †Parahippus pawniensis
  †Paramylodon
 †Paramylodon harlani
 †Parapaenemarmota
 †Parapaenemarmota oregonensis
 Parapholas
 †Parapholas californica
 †Parapliosaccomys
 †Parapliosaccomys oregonensis
 †Parasyrinx
 †Parasyrinx delicata
 †Paratomarctus
 †Paratomarctus temerarius
  †Paratylopus
 †Paronychomys
 †Paronychomys shotwelli – type locality for species
 †Paroreodon
 †Paroreodon parvus
 †Paroreodon stocki
  †Parrotia
 †Parrotia brevipetiolata
  †Parthenocissus
 †Parthenocissus angustisulcata
 †Parthenocissus clarnensis
 Parvamussium
 †Parvamussium astoriana
 Parvicardium
 †Parvicardium eugenense
 Passalus
 †Passalus indormitus – type locality for species
 †Pasternackia
 †Pasternackia pusilla
 Patinopecten
 †Patinopecten caurinus
 †Patinopecten coosensis
 †Patinopecten oregonensis
 †Patinopecten popatulus
 †Patinopecten propatulus
  †Patriofelis
 †Patriofelis ferox
 †Pediocetes
 †Pediocetes lucasii – type locality for species
 †Pediocetes nanus – type locality for species
 †Pediocetes phasianellus
 Pekania
 †Pekania occulta – type locality for species
  †Pelagornis
 Pelecanus
 †Pelecanus erythrorhynchos
 †Pelecanus erythrorhynchus – tentative report
 Penitella
 †Penitella penita
 †Pentoperculum
 †Pentoperculum minimus
 †Perchoerus
 †Perchoerus probus
 †Peridiomys
 †Peridiomys oregonensis
 Periploma
 Perognathus
 †Perognathus stevei – type locality for species
  Peromyscus
 †Peromyscus antiquus
 †Peromyscus dentalis
 †Perse
 †Perse lincolnensis
 †Perse pittsburgensis
 †Petauristodon
 Phalacrocorax
 †Phalacrocorax auritus – tentative report
 †Phalacrocorax leptopus – type locality for species
 †Phalacrocorax macropus
 †Phalacrocorax marinavis – type locality for species
 Phalaropus
 †Phalaropus lobatus
 Phalium
 †Phalium aequisulcatum
 †Phalium turricula
 Phanerolepida
 †Phanerolepida oregonensis
 †Philotrox
 †Philotrox condoni
  †Phlaocyon
 †Phlaocyon latidens
 Phoca
  †Phoca vitulina – or unidentified comparable form
 †Phocavis – type locality for genus
 †Phocavis maritimus – type locality for species
  Phoenicopterus
 †Phoenicopterus copei – type locality for species
 †Pileosperma
 †Pileosperma minutum
 †Pileosperma ovatum
 †Pinckneya
 †Pinckneya dilcheri
 †Pinis
 †Pinis johndayensis
 †Pinnarctidion
 †Pinnarctidion rayi – type locality for species
  Pinus
 †Pinus johndayensis
 †Pinus knowltoni
 †Pistachioides
 †Pistachioides striata
  Pitar
 †Pitar clarki
 †Pitar dalli
 †Plafkeria
 †Plafkeria obliquifolia
 †Plagiolophus
 †Plagiolophus weaveri
 Platanus
 †Platanus condoni
 †Platanus condonii
 †Platanus dissecta
 †Platanus exaspera
 †Platanus hirticarpa
  †Platygonus
 †Platygonus brachirostris
 †Platygonus oregonensis
 †Platygonus vetus – or unidentified comparable form
 †Pleiolama
 †Pleiolama vera – or unidentified comparable form
 †Plesiocolopirus
 †Plesiocolopirus hancocki
 †Plesiogulo
 †Plesiogulo marshalli
 †Plesiosorex
 †Plesiosorex donroosai – or unidentified comparable form
 †Pleurolicus
 †Pleurolicus sulcifrons
 †Pleurolira
 †Pleurolira oregonensis
 †Pleuroliria
 †Pleuroliria bicarinata
 †Plioceros
 †Pliocyon – or unidentified comparable form
 †Pliocyon medius
  †Pliohippus
 †Pliohippus spectans
 †Plionarctos
 †Plionictis
 †Plionictis ogygia
 †Plionictis oregonensis
 †Pliosaccomys
 †Pliotaxidea
 †Pliotaxidea nevadensis
 †Pliozapus
 †Pliozapus solus
 Podiceps
  †Podiceps auritus – tentative report
 Podilymbus
  †Podilymbus podiceps
 Pododesmus
 †Pododesmus macrochisma
  †Pogonodon
 †Pogonodon brachyops
 †Pogonodon platycopis – type locality for species
  Polinices
 †Polinices canalis
 †Polinices draconis
 †Polinices galianoi
 †Polinices washingtonensis
 †Polinices washingtoni
 †Polinicies
 †Polinicies clementensis
 †Polinicies nuciformis
 †Pollostosperma
 †Pollostosperma dictyum
 †Polygrana
 †Polygrana nutbedense
  †Polypodium – or unidentified comparable form
 †Pontolis – type locality for genus
 †Pontolis magnus – type locality for species
 †Potamogeton
 †Potamogeton parva
 †Potanospira
 †Potanospira fryi
 †Praehyalocylis
 †Praehyalocylis cretacea
 †Priscofusus
 †Priscofusus coli – or unidentified comparable form
 †Priscofusus geniculus
 †Priscofusus medialis
 †Priscofusus medialus
 †Priscofusus stewarti
 †Pristichampsus
 †Procadurcodon – report made of unidentified related form or using admittedly obsolete nomenclature
  †Procamelus
 †Procamelus grandis – or unidentified comparable form
 †Procerapex
 †Procerapex bentsonae
 Proischyromys – type locality for genus
 †Proischyromys perditus – type locality for species
 †Promartes – or unidentified comparable form
  †Promerycochoerus
 †Promerycochoerus macrostegus
 †Promerycochoerus superbus
 †Proneotherium – type locality for genus
 †Proneotherium repenningi – type locality for species
 †Pronotolagus
  Propeamussium
 †Propeamussium clallamensis – or unidentified comparable form
 †Prosomys
 †Prosomys mimus – type locality for species
 †Prosthennops
 †Prosthennops serus – tentative report
 †Proterozetes – type locality for genus
 †Proterozetes ulysses – type locality for species
  †Protitanops
 †Protitanops curryi
 †Protolabis – or unidentified comparable form
 †Protorepomys – type locality for genus
 †Protospermophilus
 †Protospermophilus malheurensis
 Protothaca
 †Protothaca staleyi
 †Pruniticarpa
 †Pruniticarpa cevallosii
  Prunus
 †Prunus olsonii
 †Prunus weinsteinii
 Psammacoma
 †Psammacoma arctata
  †Psephophorus – tentative report
 †Psephophorus oregonensis – type locality for species
  †Pseudaelurus
 †Pseudoblastomeryx
 †Pseudoblastomeryx advena
 †Pseudotheridomys
 †Pseudotheridomys pagei
 †Pseudotomus
 †Pseudotrimylus
 †Pseudotrimylus mawbyi
 †Pseudotsuga
 †Pseudotsuga laticarpa
 Pteris
 †Pteris silvicola
 Pterocarya
 †Pterocarya mixta
 †Pterocarya occidentalis
 †Pteronarctos – type locality for genus
 †Pteronarctos goedertae – type locality for species
 †Pteronarctos piersoni – type locality for species
 †Pteronepelys
 †Pteronepelys wehrii
 †Pulvinisperma
 †Pulvinisperma minutum
 Puncturella
 †Puncturella galeata
 Pupillaria – tentative report
 Purpura
 †Purpura foliata
 †Purpura lurida
 Pyramidella – tentative report
 Pyrenacantha
 †Pyrenacantha occidentalis
 †Pyrisemen
 †Pyrisemen attenuatum
  †Pyrus
 †Pyrus oregonensis

Q

  Quercus
 †Quercus berryi
 †Quercus consimilis
 †Quercus paleocarpa
 Querquedula
 †Querquedula pullulans – type locality for species
 †Quintacava
 †Quintacava velosida

R

 Raja
 Rallus
  †Rallus limicola
 Raninoides
 †Raninoides washburnei
 Recurvirostra
  †Recurvirostra americana
 Retusa
 †Retusa petrosa
 †Retusa tantilla
 †Retusa turneri
 Rhabdus
 †Rhabdus schencki
 †Rhizocyon
 †Rhizocyon oregonensis
 Rhus
 †Rhus lesquereuxii
 †Rhus rooseae
 †Rhus varians
 †Ribes
 Rimella
 Rosa
 †Rosa hilliae
  Rubus
 †Rubus ameyeri
 †Rubus fremdii
 †Rudiocyon – type locality for genus
 †Rudiocyon amplidens – type locality for species
 †Rudiomys
 †Rudiomys mcgrewi

S

  Sabal
 †Sabal bracknellense
 †Sabal jenkinsii
 †Sabia
 †Sabia prefoetida
 Saccella
 †Saccella amelga
 †Saccella calkinsi
 Salenia
 †Salenia cascadensis – type locality for species
 †Salix schimperi
 †Sambucuspermites
 †Sambucuspermites rugulosus
 Sanguinolaria
 †Sanguinolaria townsendensis
 †Saportaspermum
 †Saportaspermum occidentalis
 Sargentodoxa
 †* Sargentodoxa globosa – type locality for species
 Sassia
 †Sassia bilineata
 Saxicavella
 †Saxicavella burnsi
 Saxidomus
  †Saxidomus gigantea
 †Saxidomus giganteus
 †Saxifragispermum
 †Saxifragispermum tetragonalis
 †Scabraecarpium
 †Scabraecarpium clarnense
 †Scalaritheca
 †Scalaritheca biseriata
 Scalina
 †Scalina becki
 †Scalina dickersoni – or unidentified related form
 †Scalopoides
 †Scalopoides ripafodiator
 †Scapanoscapter
 †Scapanoscapter simplicidens
 Scapanus
  †Scapanus latimanus
 †Scapanus proceridens
 †Scapanus shultzi – or unidentified comparable form
  Scaphander
 †Scaphander impuncatatus
 †Scaphander impunctatus – type locality for species
 †Scaphander stewarti
 †Scaphicarpium
 †Scaphicarpium radiatum
 †Schisandra
 †Schisandra oregonensis
 Schizaster
 †Schizaster diabloensis
 †Schizodontomys
 †Schizodontomys greeni
  Sciurus
 †Sciurus ballovianus
 †Sciurus wortmani
 †Scolecophagus
 †Scolecophagus affinis – type locality for species
 †Scutella
 †Scutella gabbi
 Searlesia – tentative report
 †Searlesia carlsoni
 Semele
 †Semele willamettensis
 Sequoia
  †Sequoia affinis
 †Seuku
 †Seuku emlongi – type locality for species
 †Sewellelodon
 †Sewellelodon predontia – or unidentified comparable form
 Sideroxylon
 †sideroxylon? subangularis – type locality for species
 Siliqua
 †Siliqua patula
 †Simocetus – type locality for genus
 †Simocetus rayi – type locality for species
  †Simocyon
 †Simocyon primigenius
 Simomactra
 †Simomactra falcata
 Sinum
 †Sinum obliquum
 †Sinum scopulosum
 Solariella
 †Solariella cicca – type locality for species
 †Solariella cidaris
 Solemya
 †Solemya ventricosa
 Solen
 †Solen sicarius
 †Solen townsendensis
 Solena
 †Solena conradi
 †Solena eugenensis
 †Solena novacularis
  †Somatochlora
 †Somatochlora oregonica – type locality for species
  Spermophilus
 †Spermophilus gidleyi
 †Spermophilus mckayensis
 †Spermophilus shotwelli
 †Spermophilus tephrus
 †Spermophilus wilsoni
 †Sphaerosperma
 †Sphaerosperma riesii
 †Sphenophalos
 †Sphenosperma
 †Sphenosperma baccatum
 †Spirocrypta
 †Spirocrypta pileum
 Spirotropis
 †Spirotropis calodius
 †Spirotropis kincaidi
 †Spirotropis washingtonensis
 Spisula
 †Spisula densata
 †Spisula eugenensis
  Spizaetus
 †Spizaetus pliogryps
  †Steneofiber
 †Steneofiber gradatus
 Stephanodiscus
 †Stephanodiscus excentricus
 †Stephanodiscus niagarae
 †Stephanodiscus rhombus – type locality for species
  Stercorarius
 †Stercorarius schufeldti – type locality for species
 Sterna
 †Sterna elegans – tentative report
 †Sterna forsteri
 †Sterna fosteri – tentative report
  Sthenictis
 †Sthenictis junturensis – type locality for species
 †Stichopsammia – tentative report
 †Stichopsammia vokesi
 †Stockeycarpa
 †Stockeycarpa globosa
 †Stomechinus
 †Stomechinus dissimilaris – type locality for species
 †Striatisperma
 †Striatisperma coronapunctatum
 Strongylocentrotus
 Sturnella
 †Suavodrillia
 †Suavodrillia winlockensis
  †Subhyracodon
 Surculites
 †Surculites condonana
 †Surculites wynoocheensis
 Sveltella
 †Sveltella exiliplex
 †Sveltella keaseyensis – type locality for species
 Symplocos
 †Symplocos nooteboomii

T

 †Tanyoplatanus
 †Tanyoplatanus cranei
  Tapirus
 †Tapirus californicus – or unidentified comparable form
 Tapiscia
 †Tapiscia occidentalis
 Taranis
 †Taranis columbiana
 †Tardontia
 †Tardontia occidentale – or unidentified comparable form
  Taxidea
 †Taxus
 †Taxus masonii
 Tegula
 †Tegula stantoni
 †Tejonia
 †Tejonia moragai
  †Teleoceras
 †Teleoceras fossiger
 †Teleoceras hicksi
 †Teleoceras medicornutum
 †Teletaceras
 †Teletaceras radinskyi – type locality for species
  Tellina
 †Tellina aduncanasa
 †Tellina aragonia
 †Tellina emacerata
 †Tellina eugenia
 †Tellina idae – or unidentified related form
 †Tellina lincolnensis
 †Tellina pittsburgensis
 †Tellina quasimacoma
 †Temnocyon
 †Temnocyon altigenis
 †Temnocyon fingeruti – type locality for species
 †Tenudomys – or unidentified comparable form
 †Tenuisperma
 †Tenuisperma ellipticum
 †Tephrocyon
 †Tephrocyon rurestris
 Terebratalia
 †Terebratalia occidentalis
 Terebratulina
 †Terebratulina unguicula
 Terminalia
 †Terminalia oregona
  †Tetraclinis
 †Tetraclinis potlachensis
 Thais
 †Thais lamellosa
 †Thais lima – or unidentified related form
 †Thanikaimonia
 †Thanikaimonia geniculata
  Thesbia – report made of unidentified related form or using admittedly obsolete nomenclature
 †Thesbia antiselli: synonym of † Xenoturris antiselli (F. Anderson & B. Martin, 1914)
 †Thinohyus
 †Thinohyus lentus
  Thomomys
 †Thomomys townsendii
 Thracia
 †Thracia condoni
 †Thracia keaseyensis – type locality for species
 †Thracia trapezoides
  †Ticholeptus
 †Ticholeptus zygomaticus
 †Ticholepus
 †Ticholepus zygomaticus
 †Tiffneycarpa
 †Tiffneycarpa scleroidea
  Tilia
 †Tilia aspera
 †Tilia circularis
 †Tilia fossilensis
 †Tilia lamottei
 †Tilia pedunculata
 †Tilia penduculata
 †Tinomiscoidea
 †Tinomiscoidea occidentalis
 Tinospora
 †Tinospora elongata
 †Tinospora hardmanae
  †Torreya
 †Torreya clarnensis
 †Torreya masonii
 Totanus
 †Totanus melanoleucas
 †Toxicodendron
 †Toxicodendron wolfei
 Trema
 †Trema nucilecta
 Tresus
 †Tresus pajaroanus
  Trichotropis
 †Trichotropis cancellata
 †Trichotropis insignis
 †Trigonostela
 †Trigonostela oregonensis
 †Tripartisemen
 †Tripartisemen bonesii
 †Triplascapha
 †Triplascapha collinsonae
 †Triplexivalva
 †Triplexivalva rugata
 †Triplochitioxylon – type locality for genus
 †Triplochitioxylon oregonensis – type locality for species
 †Trisepticarpium
 †Trisepticarpium minutum
 †Tritonifusus
 †Tritonifusus rectirostis
 Trochita
  Trophon
 †Trophon halibrectus
 †Trophon kernensis
 †Trophon platacantha – type locality for species
 †Truncatisemen
 †Truncatisemen sapotoides
 †Tsaphanomys – type locality for genus
 †Tsaphanomys shotwelli
 †Tsuga
 †Tsuga sonomensis
 Turricula
 †Turricula emerita
 †Turricula keaseyensis
 †Turrinosyrinx
 †Turrinosyrinx nodifera
 †Turrinosyrinx nodilifera
 †Turrinosyrinx packardi – or unidentified comparable form
 Turris
 †Turris coli
 †Turris impecunia
 †Turris perversa
 †Turris smithi
  Turritella
 †Turritella buwaldana
 †Turritella keaseyense
 †Turritella keaseyensis – type locality for species
 †Turritella oregonensis
 †Turritella pittsburgensis
 †Turritella uvasana
 †Tylocephalonyx
 Tympanuchus
  †Tympanuchus pallidicinctus
 †Typhoides
 †Typhoides buzekii

U

  Ulmus
 †Ulmus chaneyi
 †Ulmus speciosa
 †Ulospermum
 †Ulospermum hardingae
 †Unknown
 †Unknown dicotyledonous
 †Unknown monocotyledonous
 †Ursavus
 †Ursavus primaevus – or unidentified comparable form

V

 Venericardia
 †Venericardia aragonia – or unidentified comparable form
 †Venericardia hornii
 †Venericardia merriami – or unidentified comparable form
 †Venericardia planicosta
 †Vertipecten
 †Vertipecten fucanus – or unidentified comparable form
  †Viburnum
 †Viburnum tubmanum
  Vitis
 †Vitis magnisperma
 †Vitis tiffneyi
 Vulpes
 †Vulpes stenognathus

W

 †Wheelera
 †Wheelera lingnicrusta

X

  Xema
 †Xema sabinii
 †Xenicohippus
 †Xenicohippus craspedotum
 †Xylotitan – type locality for genus
 †Xylotitan cenosus – type locality for species

Y

 †Yaquinacetus – type locality for genus
 †Yaquinacetus meadi – type locality for species
 Yoldia
 †Yoldia cooperii – or unidentified comparable form
 †Yoldia impressa
 †Yoldia oregona
 †Yoldia seminuda
 †Yoldia tenuissima

Z

 Zalophus
  †Zalophus californianus
 †Zanthopsis
 †Zanthopsis rathbunae – type locality for species
 Zelkova
 †Zelkova hesperia
 †Zelkova oregoniana
 †Zingiberopsis

References

 

Cenozoic
Oregon